Harry C. Pohlman Field is a baseball field located in Beloit, Wisconsin, United States. The stadium was built in 1982 and holds 3,501 people. It was the home of the Beloit Snappers minor league baseball team of the Midwest League/High-A Central from its founding until July 18, 2021.

The Beloit Memorial High School and Beloit American Legion baseball teams both play their home games there as well.

History
The ballpark's construction began in 1981 and was completed in April 1982. Its name was originally Telfer Park until the 1987 season, when it was named after Harry C. Pohlman, who was a long-time coach in the Beloit school system and in American Legion Baseball. He was also an original member of the Beloit Brewers board of directors. The stadium hosted the Midwest League All-Star Game in 1986.

Seating capacity
The seating capacity has been as follows:
3,100 (1982–1985)
3,800 (1986–1989)
3,100 (1990)
3,200 (1991–1996)
3,501 (1997–present)

Improvements
After the 2012 season, the city of Beloit appropriated $100,000 in order to completely redo the outfield. The outfield was raised and leveled with the infield and a new sprinkler system was installed. After the 2013 season, the concrete making up the concourses was repaired.

New stadium
The Snappers started the 2021 season at Pohlman Field before officially moving to the new ABC Supply Stadium in August. The first game at ABC Supply Stadium was on August 3, 2021. It has not been confirmed whether or not the Beloit Memorial High School and Beloit American Legion will move into the new stadium but it is assumed that they will not. The Snappers final game at Pohlman Field was on July 18, 2021, a 5-4 win over the Quad Cities River Bandits

References

External links
 Pohlman Field - Beloit Snappers Pohlman Field
 Telfer Park - Welcome to the City of Beloit
 Pohlman Field - Beloit, Wisconsin - Ballpark Reviews
 Pohlman Field - Minor League Ballparks

Buildings and structures in Beloit, Wisconsin
Minor league baseball venues
Baseball venues in Wisconsin
Tourist attractions in Rock County, Wisconsin
Midwest League ballparks
1982 establishments in Wisconsin
High school baseball venues in the United States
Sports venues completed in 1982